Robert Ryan (c.1951 -), also known as Tom Neale, is an English author, journalist and screenwriter. Born in Liverpool, he moved to London to study natural sciences at university and began his writing career in the late 1980s for The Face, Arena and the US edition of GQ, and then Sunday Times.

Ryan published his first novel, Underdogs, in 1999 and collaborated with jazz trumpeter Guy Barker on an extended version of a piece called Underdogs, based on the novel. As of 2010, he published eleven more novels and was working on a novel due for release in 2011. His most successful and acclaimed novels as of 2010 are Death on the Ice, which was praised and recommended by the Antarctic Heritage Trust, and Empire of Sand, inspired by David Lean’s Lawrence of Arabia, to end the book where the film begins. He is also known for his Morning, Noon and Night series of books, Early One Morning (2002), The Blue Noon (2003), Night Crossing (2004), and After Midnight (2005), and for the Vince Piper series he wrote under the pseudonym Tom Neale: Steel Rain (2005) and Copper Kiss (2006). Most of his novels are set in historical wars, such as World War I and World War II.

Using the pseudonym R. J. Bailey, Robert Ryan and his wife Deborah Ryan collaboratively write the Sam Wylde series of mysteries.

Novels
Underdogs (1999)Nine Mil (2000)Trans Am (2001)The Last Sunrise (2006)Dying Day (2007)Empire of Sand (2008)Death on the Ice (2009)Sunset Road (2010)Signal Red (2010)

Noon and Night seriesEarly One Morning (2002), Book 1 in the Morning, Noon and Night seriesBlue Noon (2003), Book 2 in the Morning, Noon and Night seriesNight Crossing (2004), Book 3 in the Morning, Noon and Night seriesAfter Midnight (2005), Book 4 in the Morning, Noon and Night series

Vince Piper seriesSteel Rain (2005), Book 1 in the Vince Piper series, by Tom NealeCopper Kiss (2006), Book 2 in the Vince Piper series, by Tom Neale

Dr. Watson seriesDead Man's Land (2012), Book 1 in the Dr. Watson seriesThe Dead Can Wait (2014), Book 2 in the Dr. Watson seriesA Study in Murder (2015), Book 3 in the Dr. Watson seriesThe Sign of Fear'' (2016), Book 4 in the Dr. Watson series

References

21st-century English novelists
English male journalists
Novelists from Liverpool
Living people
1960s births
English male novelists
21st-century English male writers